The Last Judgment (French: Le jugement dernier) is a 1945 French drama film by René Chanas starring Raymond Bussières, Jean Davy and Jean Desailly. It is set during the Second World War in a German-occupied country in Central Europe.

It recorded admissions in France of 1,468,085.

Main cast
Raymond Bussières as Kroum
Jean Davy as Stefan
Jean Desailly as Kvril
Michèle Martin as Milia
Louis Seigner as Bora
Jean Brochard as Svoboda
Paul Oettly as Professeur Yakotcha
Robert Dalban as le policier civil
Michel Vitold as Vassili 
Sandra Milovanoff as Madame Svoboda
René Bourbon as le patron de la taverne
Georges Baconnet
Roger Blin
Jean-Roger Caussimon
Erno Crisa

References

Bibliography
Hayward, Susan. French National Cinema. Routledge, 2004.

External links

1945 films
Films directed by René Chanas
French drama films
1945 drama films
1940s French-language films
French World War II films
French black-and-white films
1940s French films